Brigadier-General Sir Harold Brewer Hartley  (3 September 1878 – 9 September 1972) was a British physical chemist. He moved from academia to important positions in business and industry, including serving as Chairman of the British Overseas Airways Corporation.

Early life
He was the only child of the collector and bibliophile Harold T. Hartley (1851–1943). His mother died in 1884 when he was a young child and his father later remarried. The future academic was educated at Dulwich College, and Balliol College, Oxford. As a tutor at Balliol, he supervised the research of Edmund Bowen and Cyril Hinshelwood.

First World War
Hartley served in the First World War and was awarded the Military Cross.

Honours
He was appointed an Officer of the Order of the British Empire in the 1918 Birthday Honours. He was Bedford Lecturer in Physical Chemistry, at Balliol College, University of Oxford.
He was knighted in 1928, made KCVO in 1944, GCVO in 1957 and Companion of Honour in 1967.

He was elected a Fellow of the Royal Society in May 1926. His candidacy citation read:

He gave the address "Man's Use of Energy" as president of the British Association for 1949–1950. He received the Hoover Medal in 1968.

Family
Hartley was married in 1906 to Gertrude, eldest daughter of Arthur Lionel Smith, who was later Master of Balliol College. They had one son and one daughter.

See also
 Balliol-Trinity Laboratories
 LMS Scientific Research Laboratory

References

External links
 The Papers of Sir Harold Hartley held at Churchill Archives Centre

1878 births
1972 deaths
British Army brigadiers
Military personnel from London
Scientists from London
People educated at Dulwich College
Alumni of Balliol College, Oxford
Fellows of Balliol College, Oxford
English physical chemists
Recipients of the Military Cross
Members of the Order of the Companions of Honour
Knights Grand Cross of the Royal Victorian Order
Fellows of the Royal Society
British Army generals of World War I
Commanders of the Order of the British Empire
People of the British Overseas Airways Corporation
Royal Leicestershire Regiment officers